Sclerodisca papuana is a species of moth from the family Tortricidae. It is mostly found in Papua New Guinea, where it has been recorded from the D'Entrecasteaux Islands, specifically (Goodenough Island).

References

Tortricini
Endemic fauna of Papua New Guinea
Moths of Papua New Guinea
D'Entrecasteaux Islands
Moths described in 1964
Taxa named by Józef Razowski